Local extinction, also extirpation, is the termination of a species (or other taxon) in a chosen geographic area of study, though it still exists elsewhere. Local extinctions are contrasted with global extinctions.

Local extinctions mark a change in the ecology of an area. It has sometimes been followed by a replacement of the species taken from other locations, such as with wolf reintroduction.

The term "local extinction" is highly vernacular. The more proper biological term is extirpation.

Discussion

Glaciation is one factor that leads to local extinction. This was the case during the Pleistocene glaciation event in North America. During this period, most of the native North American species of earthworm were killed in places covered by glaciation. This left them open for colonization by European earthworms brought over in soil from Europe.

Species naturally become extirpated from islands over time. The number of species an island can support is limited by its geographical size. Because many islands were relatively recently formed due to climate change at the end of the Pleistocene when the sea level rose, and these islands most likely had the same complement of species as found on the mainland, counting the species which still survive at present on a statistically large enough amount of islands will give the parameters with which certain groups of species such as plants or birds will become less biodiverse on a given island over a given period of time, depending on its size. The same calculations can also be applied to determine when species will disappear from nature parks ('islands' in many senses), mountain tops and mesas (see sky islands), forest remnants or other such distributional patches. This research also demonstrates that certain species are more prone to extinction than others, a species has an intrinsic extinction-ability (incidence function).

Some species exploit or require transient or disturbed habitats, such as vernal pools, a human gut, or burnt woodland after forest fires, and are characterised by highly fluctuating population numbers and shifting distributional patterns. Many natural ecosystems cycle through a standard succession, pioneer species disappear from a region as the ecosystem matures and reaches a climax community.

A local extinction can be useful for research: in the case of the Bay checkerspot butterfly, scientists, including Paul R. Ehrlich, chose not to intervene as a population disappeared from an area in order to study the process.

Many crocodilian species have experienced localized extinction, particularly the saltwater crocodile (Crocodylus porosus), which has been extirpated from Vietnam, Thailand, Java, and many other areas.

Major environmental events, such as volcanic eruptions, may lead to large numbers of local extinctions, such as with the 1980 Mount St. Helens eruption, which led to a fern spike extinction.

Heat waves can lead to local extinction. In New Zealand, during the summer of 2017–2018, sea surface temperatures around parts of South Island exceeded , which was well above normal. Air temperatures were also high, exceeding . These high temperatures, coupled with small wave height, led to the local extinction of Bull Kelp (Durvillaea spp.) from Pile Bay.

Lagoa Santa, Brazil has lost almost 70% of the local fish species over the last 150 years. These include Acestrorhynchus lacustris, Astyanax fasciatus, and Characidium zebra. This could be caused by the introduction of non-native species, like Talapia rendalli, into the lagoon, changes in water level and organic pollution.

Local extinctions can be reversed, in some cases artificially. Wolves are a species that have been reintroduced into parts of their historical range. This has happened with red wolves (Canis rufus) in the United States in the late 1980s and also grey wolves in Yellowstone National Park in the mid-1990s. There have been talks of reintroducing wolves in Scotland, Japan, and Mexico.

Subpopulations and stocks
When the local population of a certain species disappears from a certain geographical delimitation, whether fish in a drying pond or an entire ocean, it can be said to be extirpated or locally extinct in that pond or ocean. 

A particular total world population can be more or less arbitrarily divided into 'stocks' or 'subpopulations', defined by political or other geographical delimitations. For example, the Cetacean Specialist Group of the International Union for Conservation of Nature (IUCN) has assessed the conservation status of the Black Sea stock of harbour porpoise (Phocoena phocoena) that touches six countries, and COSEWIC, which only assesses the conservation status of wildlife in Canada, even assesses Canadian species that occur in the United States or other countries.

While the IUCN mostly only assesses the global conservation status of species or subspecies, in some older cases it also assessed the risks to certain stocks and populations, in some cases these populations may be genetically distinct. In all, 119 stocks or subpopulations across 69 species had been assessed by the IUCN in 2006. If a local stock or population becomes extinct, the species as a whole has not become extinct, but extirpated from that local area.

Examples of stocks and subdivisions of world populations assessed separately by the IUCN for their conservation status are:
 Marsh deer (three populations assessed)
 Blue whale, North Pacific and North Atlantic stocks
 Bowhead whale, Balaena mysticetus (five populations assessed, from critically endangered to LR/cd)
 Lake sturgeon, Acipenser fulvescens, Mississippi & Missouri Basins population assessed as vulnerable
 Wild common carp, Cyprinus carpio (distribution in the River Danube)
 Black-flanked rock-wallaby Petrogale lateralis (MacDonnell Ranges population and Western Kimberly population)

The IUCN also lists countries where assessed species, subspecies or geographic populations are found, and from which countries they have been extirpated or reintroduced.

See also
List of extinct animals
Threatened species
Extinct in the wild

References
 

Extinction